The Cavanagh Company is an American bakery that is specialized in manufacturing and supplying altar bread, mainly to Catholic, Episcopal, Lutheran and Southern Baptist churches in the United States, Australia, Canada and Britain.  They are based in Greenville, Rhode Island, and sell approximately 850 million wafers each year.

References

External links

Food and drink companies of the United States
Bakeries of the United States
Companies based in Rhode Island